Fairview Independent Schools is a public school district based in Boyd County, Kentucky, United States. The district serves the area within the census-designated place of Westwood. The district consists of two schools: Fairview High School and Fairview Elementary School. The elementary school serves students from Pre-K to fifth grade and the high school serves students from sixth grade to twelfth grade.

References

External links
 Fairview Independent Schools

School districts in Kentucky
Education in Boyd County, Kentucky